The Schrödinger Medal is an annual award presented by the World Association of Theoretical and Computational Chemists for "one outstanding theoretical and computational chemist".

Recipients

See also 
 Erwin Schrödinger Prize

References

External links